The area currently occupied by the U.S. State of New Mexico has undergone numerous changes in occupancy and territorial claims and designations. This geographic chronology traces the territorial evolution of New Mexico.


Timeline
Historical territorial claims of Spain in the present State of New Mexico:
Nueva Vizcaya, 1562–1821
Santa Fe de Nuevo México, 1598–1821
Treaty of Córdoba of 1821
Historical territorial claims of France in the present State of New Mexico:
Louisiane, 1682–1764
Treaty of Fontainebleau of 1762
Historical territorial claims of Spain in the present State of New Mexico:
Luisiana, 1764–1803
Third Treaty of San Ildefonso of 1800
Historical territorial claims of France in the present State of New Mexico:
Louisiane, 1803
Vente de la Louisiane of 1803
Historical territorial claims of Mexico in the present State of New Mexico:
Santa Fé de Nuevo México, 1821–1848
Treaty of Guadalupe Hidalgo of 1848
Historical territorial claims of the Republic of Texas in the present State of New Mexico:
Disputed territory east of the Rio Grande, 1836–1845
Texas Annexation of 1845
Historical political divisions of the United States in the present State of New Mexico:
Unorganized territory created by the Louisiana Purchase, 1803–1804
District of Louisiana, 1804–1805
Territory of Louisiana, 1805–1812
Territory of Missouri, 1812–1821
Territory of Arkansaw, 1819–1836
Adams–Onís Treaty of 1819
Disputed territory created by the Texas Annexation, 1845–1850
Compromise of 1850
Mexican–American War, 1846–1848
U.S. Military Province of New Mexico, 1846
U.S. Provisional Government of New Mexico 1846–1850
Unorganized territory created by the Treaty of Guadalupe Hidalgo, 1848–1850
State of Deseret (extralegal), 1849–1850
Proposed state of New Mexico, 1850
Territory of New Mexico, 1850–1912
Gadsden Purchase of 1853
American Civil War, 1861–1865
Arizona Territory (CSA), 1861–1865
State of New Mexico since 1912

Maps

See also
History of New Mexico
Timeline of New Mexico history
Indigenous peoples of the North American Southwest
Territorial evolution of the United States
 Santa Fe de Nuevo México
 La Louisiane
 La Luisiana
 Louisiana Purchase
 District of Louisiana
 Louisiana Territory
 Arkansaw Territory
 Missouri Territory
 Mexican Empire
 Republic of Texas
 U.S. provisional government of New Mexico
 State of Deseret
 New Mexico Territory
 Confederate Territory of Arizona
 State of New Mexico

References

External links
State of New Mexico website
New Mexico State Historian
Historical Society of New Mexico

New Mexico
New Mexico
New Mexico
Pre-statehood history of New Mexico
Geography of New Mexico